María Inmaculada Cruz Salcedo (8 December 1960 – 4 August 2013) was a Spanish politician and teacher affiliated to the Spanish Socialist Workers' Party. She was elected as member of the Senate of Spain in 2011 representing Cuenca.

She died on 4 August 2013 after a long battle with cancer.

References

1960 births
2013 deaths
People from Cuenca, Spain
Members of the Senate of Spain
Spanish Socialist Workers' Party politicians
Deaths from cancer in Spain
21st-century Spanish politicians
21st-century Spanish women politicians